There were three Burmese invasions of Assam between 1817 and 1826, during which time the Kingdom of Assam came under the control of Burma from 1821 to 1825.  Locally, this period, called the manor din (Assamese: "The days/period of the Burmese") by the Indigenous Assamese people is remembered with horror. The sharp drop in population due both to depredations as well emigrations left the erstwhile kingdom in shambles. It was the climactic period of the Ahom kingdom. The British, who were earlier reluctant to colonise Assam, came into direct contact with a belligerent Burmese occupying force. Following the First Anglo-Burmese War they annexed Assam and took Manipur as a subsidiary state.

Background
In the later part of 18th century, the Kingdom of Assam in Assam was wreaked by series of rebellions. The Moamoria rebellion in Upper Assam and the Dundiya rebellion in Western Assam severely weakened the Kingdom of Ahom due to loss of lives and property. The Prime Minister Purnananda Burhagohain tried his best to reestablish Ahom rule over the region. With great efforts, he finally suppressed all the rebellions, and firmly established the royal authority over the kingdom. For smooth functioning of administration or to consolidate his power, he appointed all his relatives in high posts of the Kingdom of Ahom. Badan Chandra Borphukan, the governor of Guwahati, was anxious of the growing power of Purnananda Burhagohain. At first, he tried to make friendship with Purnananda Burhagohain. He gave his daughter Pijou Gabhoru to Purnananda's son, Urekhanath Dhekial Phukan along with a huge amount of gold ornaments and utensils as dowry. The move backfired when Purnananda Burhagohain expressed his displeasure and suspected Badan Chandra Borphukan of misusing his office. Angered by the behaviour of Purnananda Burhagohain, Badan Chandra Borphukan encouraged conspirators in the capital Jorhat with the aim to assassinate Purnananda Burhagohain. The conspiracy failed and the conspirators were punished. The alleged link of Badan Chandra Borphukan with the conspirators got revealed. Meanwhile, the people of Western Assam, complained Burhagohain about the atrocities committed by Badan Chandra Borphukan and his two sons, Janmi and Piyoli. Finally in 1815 CE, Purnananda Burhagohain decided to act and he send a deputation with orders to arrest Badan Chandra Borphukan and bring him to the capital Jorhat for justice. Pijou Gabhoru, the daughter-in-law of Purnananda Burhagohain, who was also the daughter of Badan Chandra Borphukan, sent an early message to her father, warning him of the impending danger. Warned by his daughter, Badan Chandra Borphukan escaped to Bengal, which was under British rule. Burhagohain's men caught him at Chilmari in Bengal, but he again escaped with the help of local Thanedar or Police officer. He went to Calcutta and visited the Governor General Lord Hastings with the plea for help to oust Purnananda Burhagohain. The Governor-General declined his plea stating their Policy of Non-interference in the internal matter of another kingdom. Around that time, Badan Chandra[Borphukan met the envoy of Burmese King Bodawpaya, who was on a visit at Calcutta. The envoy, after hearing his plea took him to Burma and fixed an appointment with Bodawpaya.

First Burmese invasion
In 1816, Badan Chandra Borphukan came to the court of Burmese King Bodawpaya and sought help to defeat his political rival Purnanada Burhagohain. The Burmese monarch agreed and send an expedition under a general of Bhamo, with Badan Chandra Borphukan which entered Assam in January 1817. The first battle took place on  March 27, 1817, at Ghiladhari. The Assam forces were led by Daman Gogoi, Hau Bora and Jama Khan. The battle continued for a week when Purnananda Burhagohain died due to natural causes. This, according to chronicles, led to the division in the ranks of the Ahom nobility, and due to lack of reinforcements the Assam army surrendered. Ruchinath, the son of Purnananda, became the Burhagohain, and asked the king to evacuate, who refused. This led Ruchinath to suspect that Chandrakanta Singha was in alliance with Badan Chandra Borphukan, and left for Guwahati without the king when the Burmese army advanced toward the Ahom capital at Jorhat.  The king, Chandrakanta Singha, stayed behind, received Badan Chandra Borphukan and made him the Mantri Phukan.

The Burmese army was paid 100,000 rupees and the commanders were given suitable presents. Hemo Aideo, an Ahom princess (daughter of Bagakonwar Tipam Raja and sister of Swargadeo Jogeshwar Singha) was sent to the king of Burma with 50 elephants and dowry.  The Burmese army left Assam in April 1817. Soon after, Badan Chandra was assassinated.  Ruchinath marched against Chandrakanta Singha and made Purandhar Singha the king.

Second Burmese invasion
Bodawpaya, on hearing this news, sent an army of 30,000 under the command of Kiamingi (Ala Mingi Borgohain) and guided by Patalang Senapati (Momai Barua).   This army was met by an army led by Jaganath Dhekial Phukan on February 15, 1819, at Phulpanisiga, near Janji.  The Burmese army was defeated with a loss of about 300 soldiers and retreated a short distance.  The Assam army, instead of pursuing the defeated Burmese, returned to the Ahom capital Jorhat leading to much confusion and panic.  Failing to instill confidence, Ruchinath Burhagohain and Purandar Singha sailed down to Guwahati, and the Burmese army was able to occupy the capital two days later.

Chandrakanta was reinstated as the king on March 9, 1819, followed by execution of the Ahom officials who had supported Ruchinath Burhagohain; and in the middle of April 1819 Kiamingi left for Burma leaving Mingimaha Tilwa in charge.  Under Tilwa's orders, Patalang pursued Ruchinath, engaged his forces in Nagaon and finally pushed him beyond Assam chokey.  Patalang was made the Borbarua and the Burmese contingent returned to Burma on January 27, 1820.  To express his gratitude to Bodawpaya, Chandrakanta Singha sent a princess, Upama Aideo, along with officials and attendants.

Nevertheless, Chandrakanta's attitude toward the Burmese changed soon after.  Patalang, who was originally a Kachari, persuaded the king to shake off Burmese allegiance and had a fort constructed at Jaypur (Dighalighat).

Third Burmese invasion
In 1819, Bagyidaw became the king of Burma and decided to annex Assam. He sent Mingimaha Tilwa to Assam in  February 1821.  Patalang Borbarua was killed and Chandrakanta Singha fled to Guwahati.  Mingimaha killed a number of Ahom officials and installed Punyadhar (Jogeshwar Singha), a brother of Hemo Aideo, as the king.

Chandrakanta Singha's response
Chandrakanta Singha made his camp at Guwahati and lead his campaign against the Burmese with Maharaja Ranjit Singh's help. Maharaja of Punjab sent a force of more than 10,000 ferocious Sikh soldiers in support of Ahom King against Burma.
Purandar, who was unable to raise an army in the British territory, raised one in Bhutan under Robert Bruce, but this force was dispersed by Chandrakanta's Sikh forces in May 1821.  A large force, deputed by Tilwa, advanced against Chandrakanta (September 1821), who retreated to Assam Chokey and then to the British territories.  Unlike Purandar, Chandrakanta was able to raise a force mainly of Sikhs soldiers, and he retook Assam Chokey (October 1821) and Guwahati (December 1821) and pitched his camp at Mahgarh, near Jorhat, on March 15, 1822. The commander of the Sikh soldiers, Chataniya Singh of Lahore was killed although the Sikhs routed the Burmese hordes.

Bagyidaw, on hearing of the Assam situation, sent in a 20,000 strong contingent under Mingi Maha Bandula who attacked and defeated the forces of Chandrakanta in April 1822.  Chandrakanta fell back to Guwahati, and finally to Assam chaki, where he encountered Mingimaha Tilwa in June 1822.  He was defeated and had to further retreat into the British territory.  After this victory, the Burmese declared Mingimaha Tilwa the Raja of Assam and brought an end to the sovereign Ahom rule in Assam.

Direct Burmese rule
The defeat of Chandrakanta at Assam Chokey brought the Burmese face-to-face with the British in the Brahmaputra valley.  Tilwa demanded the British hand over the fugitive king, and threatened to enter British territory to seize him, with about 7,000 troops at Assam Chokey and 1,000 more at Guwahati under Bandula.  Nevertheless, the Burmese troops faced logistics issues, and as a result Bandula left Guwahati, leaving Tilwa at Guwahati with only 1,000 troops.  At this juncture, the Chandrakanta Singha was invited by the Burmese to come back and rule.  Chandrakanta abandoned his Baruas and Phukan's and surrendered to Tilwa at Assam Chokey.  When he reached Jorhat, he was seized and imprisoned instead.

Alternative Burmese account
This account differs a little from the Burmese account in which the expedition that started in February 1821 with the 20,000 (including 10,000 kamti Shan and Kachin levies) Burmese Army is said to have taken one and a half years to reach Assam when it defeated Chandrakanta Singha in July 1822 and made Assam a Burmese province under a military governor-general, extinguishing the 600-year-old Ahom court once and for all.  Chandrakanta Singha fled to British territory of Bengal. The British ignored Bandula's demands to surrender the fugitive king, and instead sent reinforcement units to frontier forts. Maha Bandula left a military garrison of 2000 men commanded by Maha Thilawa, and returned to Ava.

This period is remembered in Assam as very difficult, with the garrison soldiers and native marauders committing atrocities on the common people leading to thousands leaving Assam for Bengal. Much of the neighboring State of Manipur was also laid waste by the marauding armies.

By 1825, the Meiteis under the leadership of Meitei king Gambhir Singh  had repulsed the Burmese and drove them past the Chindwin river. The occupation led to frequent contacts between the Burmese and the British and finally to the First Burmese war and the Treaty of Yandaboo in 1826.  This treaty marked the end of Burmese rule and the beginning of British rule in Assam.

Atrocities during Burmese rule

Reign of terror by cruel Burmese invaders
In Buranji-vivek-ratna, Maniram Dewan, an eyewitness writes:
...in attacking the house of a rich man, would tie him with ropes and then set fire to his body.  Some they flayed alive, others they burnt in oil and others again they drove in crowds to village Naamghars or prayer-houses, which they then set on fire...  It was dangerous for a beautiful woman to meet a Burmese even on the public road.  Brahmans were made to carry loads of beef, pork and wine.  The Gosains were robbed of all their possessions.  Fathers of damsels whom the Burmese took as wives rose speedily to affluence and power.

The atrocities committed by the Burmese in Assam have passed into the common traditions of the people, and have been confirmed by the recorded versions of sufferers and eye witnesses, and of those who had come in contact with them. Gangs of local marauders and some of the neighboring hill tribes like the Jingpo/Singphos and Khamtis, having identified their interests with the invaders, committed the same atrocities on the people and carried off numerous inhabitants into slavery. Those who afford fled to the neighboring countries like Bengal, Bhutan and Cachar. It is impossible to estimate the number of person who fled, were killed or deported to Burma. The wholesale depopulation and widespread misery and agony. Consequently, this excellent valley, in the words of M'Cosh, who surveyed it a few years after the Burmese invasion Though some centuries ago richly cultivated...is now throughout six-eight or seven-eight of its extent covered  with jungle and gigantic reeds, traversed only by the wild elephant or the buffalo, where human step in unknown and the atmosphere even to the natives themselves is pregnant with febrile miasmata and death. The sort of fighting and bloody killings that took place between 1812 and 1819 when the Burmese kings of Mandalay tried to conquer and subdue the Shan Ahom kingdom in Assam, where the Burmese garrison commander Maha Thilawa's troops committed atrocities. However, the native marauders and hilly tribes, taking advantage of the unstable situation, disguised themselves as Burmese, looted the cities and probably killed more people than the invaders did. The population of Assam was greatly reduced by 2/3 and 1/3 of the men and boys were killed during this period. 

Major John Butler who came to Assam in 1837 and met many survivors of the Burmese rule recorded the story of a massacre committed in 1819-20 on the bank of the Kalang river.

"After having decapitated 50 persons in one day, the Burmese placed a large number of men, women, and children on a, bamboo platform inside a house erected of bamboo and thatch. They then set fire to the fuel placed round the building. In a few minutes 200 persons were consumed in the flames. “ All who were suspected of being inimical to the reign of terror, were seized and bound by Burmese executioners, who cut off the lobes of the poor victims’ ears and choice portions of the body, such as the points of the shoulders, and actually ate the raw flesh before the living sufferers. They then inhumanly inflicted, with a sword, deep but not mortal gashes on the body, that the mutilated might die slowly, and finally closed the tragedy by disembowelling the wretched victims."

Assam was left with 7 lakh people as estimated by the British after the Burmese rule. This event so weakened and disorganized the Ahom state that by 1839 the kingdom was completely annexed by the British. Before that from 1228 - 1839, they maintained their sovereignty for nearly 600 years.

The Burmese incursions in Manipur are said to have depopulated the country and removed all traces of Manipuri civilization. The ravages of Bodawpaya and his predecessors had reduced parts of Siam into a desert, for years the fields round Tavoy were white with human bones. To escape from Burmese oppressions the greater part of the population of Arakan had deserted their country and taken shelter in British territory “ where taxation was reasonable, and a man could go to bed at night without wondering whether his throat would be cut in the morning by order of some official“ The Muslim Pangal of Manipur too were devastated and taken as slaves by the invading Burmese armies.

Notes

References

 
 
 
 
 
 
 
 

19th-century conflicts
History of Assam
Military history of Myanmar
19th century in Burma
First Anglo-Burmese War
1810s in Asia
1820s in Asia
1810s in Burma
1820s in Burma
Military history of India
1810s in India
1820s in India
1817 in Burma
1825 in Burma
1826 in Burma